Liwia is a genus of nektaspid, a soft-bodied stem-group chelicerate. It includes the following species, both are known from borehole samples several kilometers in depth from the Zawiszyn Formation in Poland, which has also yielded Peytoia infercambriensis.

Liwia plana Lendzion, 1975
Liwia convexa Lendzion 1975

References

Nektaspida
Fossils of Poland